Khadga Bahadur Ranabhat (Nepali: खड्ग बहादुर रानाभट) born 14 June 1949 in Bhatkhola, Syangja is a Nepali male track and field coach and middle/long distance runner.

Asian Games 

 1970 Asian Games (Athlete, 3000m steeplechase) - 8th place
 1982 Asian Games (Track and field coach)
 1986 Asian Games (Track and field coach)
 2010 Asian Games (Athletics team manager)

Summer Olympics 

 1984 Summer Olympics (Track and field coach)
 1988 Summer Olympics (Track and field coach)

Marathons 

 Tenzing Hillary Everest Marathon (Technical Director)
 Lumbini Peace Marathon (Technical Director)
 Annapurna Marathon (Technical Director)
 Pokhara Marathon (Technical Director)

Achievements 

 Flag bearer for Nepal in 1984 Summer Olympics (Los Angeles)
 Vice President, Asian Track and Field Coaches Association
 Lifetime Achievement Award - Nepal Sports Journalists Forum
 Former member of National Sports Council (Nepal)
 Former member of Nepal Olympic Committee
 Founder/Chairmen Ex-Sportsman Forum Nepal
 President Naulo Ghumti Nepal
 Former Vice-Chairman, Bhatkhola VDC, Syangja

References 

1949 births
Living people
Nepalese sports coaches
Athletics (track and field) coaches
Nepalese male steeplechase runners
Nepalese male athletes
Olympic coaches